This is a list of the National Register of Historic Places listings in Andover, Massachusetts.

This is intended to be a complete list of the properties and districts on the National Register of Historic Places in Andover, Massachusetts, United States. The locations of National Register properties and districts for which the latitude and longitude coordinates are included below, may be seen in a Google map.

Essex County, of which Andover is a part, is the location of 461 properties and districts listed on the National Register. Andover itself is the location of 51 of these properties and districts listed on the National Register.

Current listings

|}

See also

 List of National Historic Landmarks in Massachusetts
 National Register of Historic Places listings in Essex County, Massachusetts

References

External links
Andover Historic Society database of historic properties
Andover Historic Society list of historic districts

 
Andover
 
Andover, Massachusetts